{{DISPLAYTITLE:C9H12O}}
The molecular formula C9H12O (molar mass: 136.19 g/mol, exact mass: 136.0888 u) may refer to:

 Mesitol (2,4,6-trimethylphenol) 
 2,3,6-Trimethylphenol

Molecular formulas